Willow Island may refer to:

Inhabited places
 Willow Island, Nebraska, U.S.
 Willow Island, West Virginia, U.S.

Islands
 Willow Island (Illinois), one of the islands in Kankakee River State Park, Illinois, U.S.
 Willow Island (Washington), one of the islands that makes up the San Juan Islands off the coast of Washington, U.S.
 Willow Island (Wisconsin), on the grounds of the Alliant Energy Center, Madison, Wisconsin, U.S.
 One of several small man-made islands in Wascana Centre, Regina, Saskatchewan, Canada 
 An island in the San Juan Islands National Wildlife Refuge, Washington, U.S.
 An island in Lake Worth in Texas, U.S.
 An island in Brandon Marsh, Warwickshire, England

Other uses
 Willow Island disaster, the 1978 collapse of a cooling tower under construction at the Pleasants Power Station at Willow Island, West Virginia
 Willow Island Lock and Dam, on the Ohio River

See also
 Willow (disambiguation)